W.B. Mason is an American business products company headquartered in Brockton, Massachusetts. They are widely known for their colorful fleet of delivery vehicles. 

The company was founded in 1898 and started out selling rubber stamps and stencils for the Brockton shoe industry; it has since expanded into office supplies, janitorial and sanitation products, shipping and packaging materials, break room and coffee supplies, foodservice products, custom printing, and other business supplies.

W.B. Mason has over 70 distribution centers and leases over 1,000 delivery trucks from Ryder servicing more than 300,000 businesses across the United States.

History
W.B. Mason was founded in 1898 by William Betts Mason in Brockton, Massachusetts, and its corporate headquarters remain in Brockton. The company started as a business that sold printed products, engraved products, and rubber stamps.

As the city of Brockton expanded in the early 20th century, largely due to the shoe industry, W.B. Mason expanded its sales offerings to include office supplies.

William Betts Mason ran the company until his death in 1912. The Mason family continued to oversee the company until the 1920s under William's wife, Marcena. In the late 1920s, W.B. Mason was sold to an employee and Brockton businessman, Samuel Kovner, who started his career out by sweeping the floors at W.B. Mason as a boy. Under Kovner, the company reached sales of $243,000.

In 1963, Kovner sold the company to his daughter and son-in-law, Helen and Joseph Greene. The Greenes added furniture to the business and the company reached nearly a million dollars in sales by Greene's death in 1973. The Greene's son Steve took over leadership of the company.

In 1983, Steve Greene and his brother, John Greene, took over ownership from their mother and invited long standing employee, Leo Meehan, to join in ownership of the company. In 1993, Steve Greene replaced his mother Helen Greene as the Chairman of the Board of Directors. At this point, the company's sales were $20 million.

Upon Greene's appointment to the board, Leo Meehan became the President and CEO of the company. Under Meehan, the company adopted a new corporate strategy focusing on local service, personalized sales, and free delivery. W.B. Mason reached sales of $247 million by 2001.

Ten years later, in 2011, the company reached $1 billion in sales. In November 2013, W.B. Mason partnered with Lyreco to provide international delivery. W.B. Mason is currently owned by the Greene and Meehan families.

In October 2018, the company was sued for trademark infringement by Minnesota based Dairy Queen over using the term "Blizzard" for marketing its bottled water products.

William Betts Mason 

William Betts Mason was born in Auckland, New Zealand in 1865. After his father's death in 1871, he immigrated to the United States with his grandmother Agnes Dunn Bettridge, mother Janet C. Mason (née Bettridge) and sisters Sarah, Eliza, and Eadith Mason. In 1872 his family moved to Brockton, at the time known as North Bridgewater, to live with Janet's brother Arthur J. C. Bettridge. Mason's first occupation was as a counter maker and trimmer in Brockton.

He married his first wife Clara W. Belcher of Randolph, Massachusetts in 1892. He continued to work in the counter making field until 1893, at which point he went to work for S.W.S. Howard, a local printing company. In 1896 he left S.W.S. Howard and went into business for himself, making specialty brass plates, checks, and rubber stamps.

In 1898, Mason founded the W.B. Mason Company as a rubber stamp and stencil company. W.B. Mason continues to manufacture its own rubber stamps today. In December 1905, Mason married his second wife, Marcena D. Horton of Bristol, Rhode Island. She ran the company from the time of Mason's death in 1912 until Samuel Kovner's acquisition of the company in the late 1920s.

Mason died in 1912. During his life, William Betts Mason sang around Brockton in the Gerrish Male Barbershop Quartet, and was a member of the Brockton-based Paul Revere Lodge of Freemasons. He was buried at Union Cemetery, a half mile from W.B. Mason headquarters. He left no children.

Products and services 
W.B. Mason provides products for the workplace. On www.wbmason.com the primary product lines include office and school supplies, paper, janitorial supplies, furniture, food and break room supplies, technology and electronics, food service, and custom print.

W.B. Mason also provides the following services: 
 Interior design and contract furniture
 Discount furniture
 Custom products (print, ad specialty, apparel)

Advertising

Branding 
In 1986, the company introduced its slogan, "Who But W.B. Mason". The slogan was later combined with a portrait of William Betts Mason to make their current corporate logo. The logo features two U.S. flags flanking the portrait of W.B. Mason, one with 50 stars to represent the current state of the union, and the other with 45 stars, the configuration at the time of the company's founding.

Media advertisement 
In 1997 W.B. Mason began advertising on television. Its inaugural commercial was played during the 1997 Super Bowl. Besides their commercials, their trucks, catalogues, and baseball park signage serve as W.B. Mason's different forms of advertising.

Sponsorships

Baseball 
W.B. Mason is the "Official Office Products Supplier" to the Boston Red Sox, Philadelphia Phillies, and New York Yankees. W.B. Mason has its corporate logo displayed throughout several teams' home ballparks including Fenway Park in Boston, Citizens Bank Park in Philadelphia, and Yankee Stadium in New York. In 2003 W.B. Mason placed its first ball park advertisement on the Green Monster at Fenway Park; this was the first advertisement painted on the Green Monster since 1947.

Philanthropy and initiatives

Projects 
In June 2017 W.B. Mason announced a $10 million donation to the Leo J. Meehan School of Business at Stonehill College in Easton, a few miles from Brockton. Stonehill is the alma mater of the current president and CEO. This was the second largest donation in the school's history. The business school  opened in August 2019. It houses Stonehill's accounting, finance, international business, management, marketing, economics and healthcare administration programs.

In 2007, W.B. Mason donated $1 million to Brockton Hospital in the name of Helen Greene.

W.B. Mason was a platinum benefactor in the opening of the Trinity Catholic Academy in Brockton.

W.B. Mason was the primary donor to W.B. Mason Stadium at Stonehill College.

In 2017 W.B. Mason Donated the John, Steven, and Caryll Greene Cancer Center at Brockton Hospital.

Sustainability 
On October 17, 2017 W.B. Mason and Workhorse Group Inc. introduced the first all-electric W.B. Mason truck.  The electric vehicle has an average range of 120 miles on a single charge and reduces vehicle emissions by 75%.

Locations
W.B. Mason has over 60 distribution centers in the United States, and provides nationwide delivery services to its customers.

References 

Companies based in Massachusetts
Economy of the Northeastern United States
Office supply companies of the United States
Retail companies established in 1898
Office supply retailers of the United States
Companies based in Plymouth County, Massachusetts
Privately held companies based in Massachusetts